Selle Royal was an Italian professional cycling team that existed from 1977 to 1978.

The team was selected to race in two editions of the Giro d'Italia, where they achieved one stage win.

Major wins
1977
 Stage 8b Giro d'Italia, Marino Basso

References

Defunct cycling teams based in Italy
1977 establishments in Italy
1978 disestablishments in Italy
Cycling teams established in 1977
Cycling teams disestablished in 1978